William Vargas Trujillo (born September 17, 1970, in Havana) is a retired male weightlifter from Cuba. He competed for his native country at the 1996 Summer Olympics, and thrice won a gold medal at the Pan American Games: in 1991, 1995 and 1999.

References
sports-reference

1970 births
Living people
Cuban male weightlifters
Weightlifters at the 1991 Pan American Games
Weightlifters at the 1995 Pan American Games
Weightlifters at the 1999 Pan American Games
Weightlifters at the 1996 Summer Olympics
Olympic weightlifters of Cuba
Pan American Games gold medalists for Cuba
Sportspeople from Havana
Pan American Games medalists in weightlifting
World Weightlifting Championships medalists
Central American and Caribbean Games medalists in weightlifting
Medalists at the 1991 Pan American Games
Medalists at the 1995 Pan American Games
Medalists at the 1999 Pan American Games
20th-century Cuban people